Thomas J. Tiberi (April 10, 1919 – November 14, 1995) was a Democratic member of the Pennsylvania House of Representatives.

References

Democratic Party members of the Pennsylvania House of Representatives
1995 deaths
1919 births
20th-century American politicians